The following is a list of Kurdish Organisations.

Europe

UK

 Kurdish PEN
 Peace Mothers

Sweden
 Kurdish Student Academic Association

France
 Kurdish Institute of Paris

Belgium
 European Kurdish Democratic Societies Congress, previously known as Confederation of Kurdish Associations (KON-KURD)
 Kurdish Institute of Brussels

Middle East

Iraq
 Action Party for the Independence of Kurdistan
 Democratic Patriotic Alliance of Kurdistan
Gorran Movement
 Islamic Fayli Grouping in Iraq
 Islamic Group Kurdistan 
 Islamic Kurdish Society
 Islamic Movement of Kurdistan
 Islamic Kurdish League
 Kurdish Revolutionary Hezbollah 
 Kurdish Tribal Association
 Kurdistan Communist Party 
 Kurdistan Democratic Party (KDP)
 Kurdistan Islamic Union 
 Kurdistan Toilers' Party 
 Kurdish Socialist Party
 Kurdistan Conservative Party 
 Kurdistan National Democratic Union 
 Kurdistan Socialist Democratic Party 
 Kurdistan Revolutionary Party 
 Patriotic Union of Kurdistan (PUK)

Iran
 Kurdish Hezbollah of Iran
 Organization of Iranian Kurdistan Struggle
 Kurdistan Democratic Party of Iran (KDPI) 
 Kurdistan Free Life Party (PJAK) 
 Eastern Kurdistan Units (YRK)
 Women's Defence Forces (HPJ)
 Komalah
 Kurdish United Front
 Kurdistan Freedom Party (PAK)
 Kurdistan Independence Alliance (HSK)
 Kurdistan Independence Mouvement (BSK)

Lebanon
 Kurdish Democratic Party
 Razkari Party

Turkey
 Communist Party of Kurdistan (KKP)
 Democracy Party (DEP)
 Democratic People's Party (DEHAP)
 Democratic Society Party (DTP)
 Hereketa İslamiya Kurdistan (HİK)
 Kurdish Hizbollah
 Islamic Party of Kurdistan (PİK)
 Kurdistan Communities Union (KCK)
 Kurdistan Democratic Party/North (KDP/Bakur)
 Kurdistan Workers' Party (PKK)
 People's Defence Forces (HPG)
 National Liberation Front of Kurdistan (ERNK)
 Peace and Democracy Party (BDP)
 Democratic Regions Party(DBP)
 Peoples' Democratic Party(HDP)
 People's Democracy Party (HADEP)
 People's Labor Party (HEP)
 Revolutionary Party of Kurdistan (PŞK)
 Rights and Freedoms Party (HAK-PAR)
 Society for the Rise of Kurdistan 
 Xoybûn (CSK)
 Workers Vanguard Party of Kurdistan (PPKK)
 Kurdistan Freedom Hawks (TAK)
 Marxist–Leninist Communist Party (MLKP)
 DHKP/C
 Communist Party of Turkey/Marxist–Leninist (TKP/ML)
 Revolutionary Headquarter 
 Communist Labour Party of Turkey/Leninist (TKEP/L)
 Patriotic Revolutionary Youth Movement (YDG-H)
 Civil Protection Units (YPS)
 Civil Protection Units-Women (YPS-Jin)

Syria
Kurdish National Alliance in Syria (HNKS)
Syrian Democratic Council (SDC)
Democratic Union Party (Syria) (PYD)
 Movement for a Democratic Society (TEV-DEM)
 People's Protection Units (YPG)
 Women's Protection Units (YPJ)
 Asayish
 Kurdish National Council (ENKS)
 Kurdistan Democratic Party of Syria (KDP-S)
 Kurdish Supreme Committee
 Kurdish Democratic Political Union
 Euphrates Volcano
 Jabhat al-Akrad
 United Freedom Forces

 
Kurdish